Manno Gate is the old south gate of the county of Yŏngbyon.  Dating to the Joseon Dynasty, the gate was first constructed in 1658, and later rebuilt in 1789. Once guarding the road to Pyongyang, it bears a striking similarity to Pyongyang's Taedong Gate.
It features a granite base topped by a two-story pavilion, the upper part of which bears a sign marking the gate as the old Yŏnju Castle Gate (古延州城門).

References

See also
 National Treasures of North Korea

National Treasures of North Korea
Buildings and structures in North Pyongan Province
1658 establishments in Asia
Buildings and structures completed in 1658
Korea